Talang 2022 is the thirteenth season of Swedish Talang and is broadcast on TV4 from 14 January. Presenter for this season are Pär Lernström, the jury consists of Sarah Dawn Finer, David Batra, Bianca Ingrosso and Edward af Sillen. Samir Badran left the show as presenter.

The winner of the season was singer Aron Eriksson-Aras.

References

Talang (Swedish TV series)
2022 Swedish television seasons